Prince 'Abdul Malik (born 30 June 1983) is the third son of Sultan Hassanal Bolkiah by his first wife, Queen Saleha, thus making him a prince of Brunei. He is also the former Chairman of the Management Committee of the Sultan Haji Hassanal Bolkiah's Foundation from 1 March 2013 until 28 February 2017.

Early years and education 
Prince Malik was born in Istana Nurul Iman, the residence of the royal family and educated in Putera-Puteri School at Istana Darul-Iman. He was also a graduate of Persekutuan Guru-Guru Melayu Brunei (PGGMB) School, Jerudong International School (JIS), and University of Brunei Darussalam (UBD) with a degree in Bachelor of Arts (BA) in Educational Studies with Second Upper Class Honours on 30 October 2008.

He has received instruction in tradition, customs, and etiquette in line with Islamic principles, just like his siblings and other members of royal families. Moreover, Malik also received religious instruction throughout his formative years and was taught how to read and write Muqaddam and Jawi.

Marriage and children
On 9 April 2015, he married 22-year-old Dayangku Raabi'atul A'dawiyyah Binti Pengiran Haji Bolkiah at Istana Nurul Iman in Bandar Seri Begawan. The wedding was attended by Malaysian sultans and royalty including Sultan Ahmad Shah of Pahang, Sultan Mizan Zainal Abidin of Terengganu, Sultan Ibrahim Ismail of Johor, Tuanku Muhriz of Negeri Sembilan, Sultan Nazrin Shah of Perak, Sultan Sharafuddin Idris Shah of Selangor and Tuanku Syed Sirajuddin of Perlis. Prince Saud bin Abdul Muhsin Al Saud, the Governor of Hail Province, Saudi Arabia, and Tun Pehin Sri Abdul Taib Mahmud, the Yang di-Pertua Negeri of Sarawak were among the special guests.

From their marriage, the royal couple has three children. On 2 March 2016, the royal couple welcomed their first child, a princess named Pengiran Anak Muthee'ah Raayatul Bolqiah. Their second daughter, Pengiran Anak Fathiyyah Rafaahul Bolqiah, was born on 10 March 2018. A third child, a daughter named Pengiran Anak Khaalishah Mishbaahul Bolqiah was born on 5 January 2020.

Legacy

Namesakes 

 Pengiran Muda Abdul Malik Religious School, a religious school in Kampong Bengkurong.
 Pengiran Muda Abdul Malik Mosque, a mosque in Kampong Tungku completed on 9 July 2012.

Honours

National 

  Order of the Crown of Brunei (DKMB)
  Sultan Hassanal Bolkiah Medal (PHBS)
  Proclamation of Independence Medal – (1 January 1984)
  Silver Jubilee Medal – (5 October 1992)
  Golden Jubilee Medal – (5 October 2017)
  National Day Silver Jubilee Medal – (23 February 2009)

Foreign 
 : 
 Installation Medal of the 14th King of Malaysia – (11 April 2012)

Ancestry

References

External links 
 Royal Wedding

|-

1983 births
Living people
Bruneian Muslims
Bruneian royalty
Sons of monarchs